Cumbria County Cricket Club (formerly Cumberland County Cricket Club) is one of twenty minor county clubs within the domestic cricket structure of England and Wales. Originally, it represented the historic counties of Cumberland and Westmorland. It now represents the ceremonial county of Cumbria, as defined by the Lieutenancies Act 1997. Cumbria was first created in 1974 as an administrative county by combining the traditional counties of Cumberland and Westmorland along with Furness (formerly a district in Lancashire) and a small part of north-west Yorkshire.

The team is currently a member of the National Counties Cricket Championship Eastern Division and plays in the NCCA Knockout Trophy. Cumbria played List A matches occasionally from 1984 until 2004 but is not classified as a List A team per se.

The club is based at the Edenside Ground, Carlisle and also plays matches around Cumbria at various places including Workington, Penrith, Netherfield Cricket Club Ground in Kendal and Barrow-in-Furness.  Carlisle, Workington and Penrith are all in the traditional county of Cumberland; Kendal is in the traditional county of Westmorland; and Barrow is traditionally in the Furness district of Lancashire.

Honours
 Minor Counties Championship (3) - 1986, 1999; 2015 shared (0) - 
 MCCA Knockout Trophy (2) - 1989, 2012

History
Cricket probably reached Cumberland and Westmorland during the 18th century. The earliest references to cricket in the region are in 1827 (Westmorland) and 1828 (Cumberland). According to Rowland Bowen's research, there was reportedly an informal county club in Westmorland about 1835. It is known that a county organisation was established on 2 January 1884.

The club formed on 10 April 1948 and has been renamed twice:
Cumberland and Westmorland County Cricket Club
Cumberland County Cricket Club: when it was admitted to the Minor Counties Championship for the 1955 season. As Cumberland it won the MCCA Knockout Trophy once in 1989 and the Minor Counties Championship three times, in 1986, 1999 and 2015
Cumbria County Cricket Club: from 1 January 2021.

Notable players

The following Cumberland cricketers also made an impact on the first-class game:
 Ian Austin
 Leonard Baichan
 David Lloyd
 Ashley Metcalfe
 Graham Monkhouse
 Gary Pratt
 Dean Hodgson
 Mike Burns

Grounds

References

Further reading
 Rowland Bowen, Cricket: A History of its Growth and Development, Eyre & Spottiswoode, 1970
 E W Swanton (editor), Barclays World of Cricket, Guild, 1986
 Playfair Cricket Annual – various editions
 Wisden Cricketers' Almanack – various editions

External links
 Cumberland CCC at England and Wales Cricket Board
 Cumberland County Cricket Club website (archived May 2017)

 
National Counties cricket
History of Cumberland
Cricket clubs established in 1948
Cricket in Cumbria